2nd New York Film Critics Circle Awards
Announced January 4, 1937 Presented January 24, 1937

Best Picture: 
 Mr. Deeds Goes to Town 
The 2nd New York Film Critics Circle Awards, announced on January 4, 1937, presented on January 24, 1937, honored the best filmmaking of 1936.

Winners

Best Picture 
Mr. Deeds Goes to Town
Runners-up – Fury and Dodsworth and Winterset

Best Director
Rouben Mamoulian – The Gay Desperado
Runner-up – William Wyler  –  These Three and Dodsworth and Fritz Lang - Fury

Best Actor
Walter Huston – Dodsworth
Runner-up – Spencer Tracy – San Francisco and Gary Cooper - Mr. Deeds Goes to Town

Best Actress
Luise Rainer – The Great Ziegfeld
Runner-up – Ruth Chatterton – Dodsworth and Norma Shearer - Romeo and Juliet

Best Foreign Film
 Carnival in Flanders
Runner-up –  Toni

External links
1936 Awards

New York Film Critics Circle Awards
New York Film Critics Circle Awards
New York Film Critics Circle Awards
New York Film Critics Circle Awards
New York Film Critics Circle Awards